Kincaidston is a housing scheme in the town of Ayr in South Ayrshire, Scotland. The estate borders Belmont to the north, Alloway to the west and the A77 to the south and east.

History 
The estate was built in the 1970s. It was built by Kyle and Carrick District Council and Digital Equipment Corporation to house workers for a nearby factory development. The estate remains partly in council hands (now South Ayrshire Council) although many of the houses are now privately owned. Most of the streets are named after flowers (for example, Celandine Bank, Honeysuckle Park and Speedwell Square) apart from Kincaidston Drive, the estate's main road.

Prior to development, Kincaidston was a farm on the outskirts of Ayr. During World War I, a Sopwith Camel crashed at the farm, killing the pilot, Captain Victor George Anderson Bush, who had been based at No.1 School of Aerial Fighting at Turnberry.

Services 
Kincaidston Primary School is located within the estate. Other amenities include a community centre, a bowling club, a Spar shop, a church, a youth cafe and several vacant units at the Cornhill Shopping Centre. There is a GP surgery and a LloydsPharmacy at the Bankfield Medical Practice. Annfield Burn flows through the scheme at the north side.

2021 explosion 
On 18 October 2021, four people were injured in an explosion that destroyed a house on Gorse Park and damaged multiple others.

See also
List of places in South Ayrshire
Public housing in the United Kingdom

References

Areas of Ayr
Housing estates in Scotland